Toxicini is a tribe of darkling beetles in the family Tenebrionidae. There are about 17 genera in Toxicini.

Genera
These genera belong to the tribe Toxicini:

 Calymmus Montrouzier, 1860  (Australasia)
 Chalcostylus Fairmaire, 1898  (tropical Africa)
 Cryphaeus Klug, 1833  (the Palearctic, tropical Africa, Indomalaya, and Australasia)
 Cylindrosia Gebien, 1922  (tropical Africa)
 Diceroderes Solier, 1841  (the Neotropics)
 Dysantes Pascoe, 1869  (tropical Africa and Indomalaya)
 Epitoxicum Bates, 1873  (Indomalaya)
 Ilyxerus Pascoe, 1866  (Australasia)
 Macellocerus Solier, 1848  (tropical Africa)
 Mychestes Pascoe, 1870  (Australasia)
 Nycteropus Klug, 1833  (tropical Africa)
 Opostirus Kirsch, 1865  (the Neotropics)
 Orcopagia Pascoe, 1868  (Australasia)
 Ozolais Pascoe, 1866  (the Neotropics)
 Taiwanocryphaeus Masumoto, 1996  (Indomalaya)
 Toxicum Latreille, 1802  (the Palearctic, Indomalaya, and Australasia)
 Wattius Kaszab, 1982  (the Neotropics)

References

Further reading

 
 

Tenebrionoidea